The Equality Party fielded twenty-one candidates in the 2003 Quebec provincial election, none of whom were elected.

References

Candidates in Quebec provincial elections
2003